Menge House Complex is a historic home located at Dolgeville in Herkimer County, New York. It was built in 1893 and is a -story, asymmetrically massed Queen Anne–style frame on a stone foundation.  It features an engaged corner tower with a pyramidal roof.  Also on the property is a carriage house/garage, woodshed, and a stone and wrought iron arched gate bearing the name "Menge."

It was listed on the National Register of Historic Places in 1996.

References

Houses on the National Register of Historic Places in New York (state)
Queen Anne architecture in New York (state)
Houses completed in 1893
Houses in Herkimer County, New York
National Register of Historic Places in Herkimer County, New York